Kate Novak is an American fantasy author.

Biography
Novak grew up in Pittsburgh, Pennsylvania where she graduated from the University of Pittsburgh with a BS in Chemistry.

She primarily published in the Forgotten Realms and Ravenloft shared worlds.

She is married to writer and game designer Jeff Grubb. Novak and Grubb are co-authors of the best-selling Finder's Stone Trilogy, and collaborated on the book Azure Bonds. The success of the book resulted in the creation of the computer game, Curse of the Azure Bonds.

Bibliography
 The Finder's Stone Trilogy (with Jeff Grubb)
 Azure Bonds (1988), 
 The Wyvern's Spur (1990), 
 Song of the Saurials (1991), 
 The Harpers (with Jeff Grubb)
 Book 10: Masquerades (1995), 
 Book 15: Finder's Bane (1997), 
 The Lost Gods (with Jeff Grubb)
 Tymora's Luck (1997), sequel to Finder's Bane,

References

Further reading

External links

20th-century American novelists
20th-century American women writers
21st-century American women
American fantasy writers
American women novelists
Living people
Role-playing game writers
University of Pittsburgh alumni
Women science fiction and fantasy writers
Year of birth missing (living people)